Ghazala Butt is a Pakistani actress. She is known for her roles in dramas Kalmoohi, Rishton Ki Dor, Babban Khala Ki Betiyann, Zindaan, Ishq Zahe Naseeb, Tohmat and Naqab Zan.

Early life
Ghazala was born on October 21, 1960 in Rawalpindi, Pakistan.

Career
Ghazala has worked at radio, theatre, and TV. PTV was her first drama platform. She was known for her tough and strong girl roles in dramas Kuda Zameen Se Gaya Nahin, Ghar and Sipahi Maqbool Hussain. She also appeared in three movies which were Miki Kharo England, Main Julian England and Load Wedding. Ghazala was praised for her comedy acting in film Main Julian England. In 2000s she was known among the audience. In 2019 she appeared in dramas Naqab Zan, Ishq Zahe Naseeb and Babban Khala Ki Betiyann.

Filmography

Television

Telefilm

Film

References

External links
 

1970 births
Living people
20th-century Pakistani actresses
21st-century Pakistani actresses
Pakistani television actresses
Pakistani film actresses
Punjabi people